A Satyanarayana Shastri (June 2, 1925 – January 14, 2004) was an Indian philosopher. After his BSc in 1943 from Central College and MSc from Dharwar, he worked in Vijaya College as a lecturer and later as a Professor for 18 years in the Department of Chemistry.

He worked with Vivekananda Yoga Anusandhana Samsthana and became the Chief Adviser of the Deemed University Vivekananda Yoga Mahavidyapeetham of VYTASA. He was also the president of Advaita Samsodhana Pratisthana chaired by Sri Arun Kumar.

He focused on Upanishads and Sadhana. He was considered a sadhak par excellence. It was believed that he turned to spirituality initially to solve his own tensions and anxieties. His exposition of Yoga Vasistha had made him very popular among his students.

Shastriji, as he was nicknamed by his students, focused on the message of the Upanishads and Sadhana and the concept of Dharma centred on Sukha Duhkha Pariksa. His talks were related to  practical examples from modern life.

His understanding of sadhana is condensed in the proclamations repeated in all his talks:

Satyanarayana Shastri died on January 14, 2004, in Bangalore. He is survived by his wife, three sons and four daughters.

Speeches 
Some of Shastriji's speeches have been uploaded on YouTube. 
You can access them by searching for the following topics. 
 A General Survey of Spiritual Study
 Vasana Ksaya - Manonasa and Atma Bodha

References

1925 births
2004 deaths
20th-century Indian philosophers